William Holabird (September 11, 1854 in Amenia, New York – July 19, 1923 in Evanston, Illinois) was an American architect.

Holabird was the son of General Samuel B. Holabird and Mary Theodosia Grant.  He studied at the United States Military Academy at West Point but resigned and moved to Chicago, where he later got married.

He worked in the architectural practice of William Le Baron Jenney next to O. C. Simonds. Shortly after receiving the commission to extend Graceland Cemetery, Jenney passed it on to his assistants who, in 1880, established the firm of Holabird & Simonds to carry out this job. In 1881, Martin Roche, who had also worked in Jenney's office, joined them as a third partner. In 1883 the firm was renamed Holabird & Roche after Simonds left to concentrate solely on Graceland Cemetery and landscape design.

Together they contributed many innovations to the architecture of the time, especially in what is now referred to as Chicago School. They designed several influential buildings, including the Marquette Building and the Gage Building. The latter included a façade designed by Louis Sullivan and was cited a Chicago architectural landmark in 1962.

William Holabird died in 1923, and Martin Roche died in 1927. Holabird's son John took over the firm with John Wellborn Root, Jr., and it was renamed Holabird & Root.

William's sister, Agnes Holabird Von Kurowsky, was the mother of Agnes von Kurowsky. His daughter Mary was the wife of General William Mackey Cruikshank.

References

Further reading 
 Robert Bruegmann, Holabird & Roche, Holabird & Root. An illustrated catalog of works, Garland (New York) in cooperation with the Chicago Historical Society 1991.

External links 
 Holabird & Root's current website
 Holabird & Roche/Root Encyclopedia of Chicago entry
 Holabird & Roche Archive at the Chicago Historical Society

19th-century American people
19th-century American architects
20th-century American architects
Architects from Illinois
Chicago school architects
Amenia, New York
People from Amenia, New York
Burials at Graceland Cemetery (Chicago)
1854 births
1923 deaths
United States Military Academy alumni